The United States Organized Crime Strike Force was created in the late 1960s for the purpose of finding and prosecuting illegal racketeering. It was formed in a congressional effort led by Senator Robert F. Kennedy.

Specifically, the Strike Forces were directed toward the identification and investigation of taxpayers and labor officials who derived substantial income from organized criminal activities. The coordination of enforcement efforts and close cooperation and liaison with other federal, state, and local enforcement agencies are necessary for effective Strike Force operations.

Many of the early investigations conducted by the Strike Forces, particularly those involving labor racketeering, were led by the Labor Department's Office of Organized Crime and Racketeering. Since 1966, the Labor Department had been investigating the connection between organized crime and organized labor as part of a Justice Department task force. Under Senate pressure the department created a separate office and put it under the inspector general's control.

From 1978 to 1984, the office brought 95 cases against alleged mobsters and union racketeers, securing 201 convictions and 55 acquittals.

By 1990, "There were 14 strike forces around the country, composed of Justice Department lawyers and agents from Federal investigative agencies, including the Federal Bureau of Investigation, the Internal Revenue Service, the Postal Service and the Labor Department. Since 1980, their efforts have led to the convictions of Mafia leaders in Boston, Brooklyn, Cleveland, Chicago, Denver, Kansas City, Los Angeles, New Haven, New Orleans, Philadelphia and Rochester."

Around 2000, the federal Strike Forces were largely disbanded in favor of state or local efforts. However, during its time, the organizations were jointly responsible for the successful investigation and conviction of high-ranking Mafiosos such as Joseph Aiuppa of the Chicago Outfit, Anthony Salerno of the Genovese Family of New York and Paul Castellano of the Gambino Family, in addition to removing large amounts of corruption from The Teamsters.

Moreover, though no longer proceeding in a formal strike force, agencies such as the Labor Department’s Office of the Inspector General continued to pursue labor racketeering and organized crime investigations.

From October 2003 through September 2004, the OIG's labor racketeering program had 130 open cases involving organized crime groups. In addition, during this time frame, its racketeering investigations resulted in over $36.5 million in monetary accomplishments, including restitutions and forfeitures, plus 260 indictments and 143 convictions.

References
https://www.irs.gov/irm/part9/irm_09-005-006.html

Defunct federal law enforcement agencies of the United States